The Royal Naval Supply and Transport Service, or RNSTS, was the civilian manned logistics service that supported the British Royal Navy and Royal Fleet Auxiliary (RFA); being part of the MOD (Navy). It was formed in 1965 and was abolished in 1994, its role (excluding the Royal Fleet Auxiliary) being taken over by the Naval Bases and Supply Agency.

Responsibilities 
The RNSTS was responsible for the maintenance, distribution and clerical oversight of all forms of stores between depot and ship. This included:
 General Naval Stores
Electronic Stores (including radar, sonar, electronic warfare and communications equipment)
Armaments
Victuals
Fuel
Motor Transport

Some RNSTS personnel served at sea on RFA replenishment ships. During the Falklands War the RNSTS was responsible for supplying the task force, as well as pressing over 50 commercial ships such as the Queen Elizabeth 2 into military service (known as STUFT, or Ships Taken Up From Trade).

The head of the RNSTS was the Director General Supply and Transport (Navy), or DGST(N). On 21 October 1982, following the conclusion of the Falklands operation, Sir Frank Cooper, PUS, sent a message to DGST(N) including 
 "...I would like you to convey to all members of the RNSTS, including the RFA,...my sincere appreciation of their considerable efforts. I know my appreciation is shared wholeheartedly by other members of the Defence Council. Without the sterling work of the RNSTS,the successful outcome of the Falklands campaign might well have been jeopardised. The tasks that fell to them were undertaken with a vigour, dedication and willingness which deserves the highest praise. I should like formally to commend the whole of the RNSTS, including the RFA, and to send congratulations and thanks to everyone involved." 

After some 30 years in being (it was formed from the separate Directorates of Stores, Victualling, Armament Supply and Movements in 1965) the RNSTS ceased to be on absorption into the Naval Bases and Supply Agency (part of the Naval Support Command) on 1 April 1994.

See also
Royal Naval Armaments Depot
Victualling Commissioners
Transport Board (Royal Navy)

References

British Warships & Auxiliaries (see section on Royal Fleet Auxiliary, p. 61) - Mike Critchley, 
RNSTS flag at FOTW Flags Of The World website at http://flagspot.net/flags/

Royal Navy
Royal Fleet Auxiliary
Military logistics of the United Kingdom
Defence agencies of the United Kingdom